Śniadka may refer to one of four villages in the administrative district of Gmina Bodzentyn, within Kielce County, Świętokrzyskie Voivodeship, in south-central Poland:

Śniadka Druga
Śniadka Parcele
Śniadka Pierwsza
Śniadka Trzecia